Protozoa Pictures is an American production company founded in 1997 by American filmmaker Darren Aronofsky, headquartered in New York City. It is mainly a handle for Aronofsky's filmography, but has financed other projects alongside Aronofsky's.

The company has a three-year first look deal with Regency Enterprises to develop film and television projects. Prior to the agreement, the company had a first look deal with Dimension Films.

Filmography

References

External links 
 Official Website

Film production companies of the United States
Mass media companies based in New York City
1997 establishments in New York City
Darren Aronofsky